The chapters of the Japanese manga series Kaze Hikaru were written and illustrated by Taeko Watanabe. The series follows Tominaga Sei, a young girl who pretends to be a boy to join the Mibu-Roshi (Special Police; later known as the Shinsengumi). However, her secret is discovered when she befriends her sensei, Okita Sōji.

The manga began its serialization in Shōgakukan's Bessatsu Shōjo Comic magazine in 1997. It transferred to Shogakukan's Monthly Flowers magazine in 2002, concluding in the July 2020 issue on May 28, 2020. The first  volume was released by Shōgakukan on October 25, 1997, and the 45th and final volume was released on February 25, 2021. Shogakukan also published the series in  format, starting on November 15, 2007; it lasted for twelve volumes total, with the final volume released on September 15, 2011. Following the end of the manga series, Watanabe published an additional spin-off chapter titled  in the January 2021 issue of Monthly Flowers on November 27, 2020. In North America, Viz Media acquired the series rights and published the manga in its female-targeted magazine Shojo Beat, from the first issue in July 2005 until September 2006. Later, it was published in the  format; the first volume was released on January 3, 2006, and the latestthe 29thwill be released on August 3, 2021. The manga has also been licensed in Indonesia by Elex Media Komputindo, in South Korea by Haksan Culture Company, in Taiwan by Chingwin Publishing Group, and in Vietnam by NXB Trẻ.

Volume list

References

External links
 Kaze Hikaru at Monthly Flowers 
 Kaze Hikaru at Viz Media
 
 

Kaze Hikaru